Jaya Sengupta (born 21 September 1943) is a Bangladesh Awami League politician, doctor, and Member of Parliament of Bangladesh. Her husband was Suranjit Sengupta, a senior leader of Bangladesh Awami League and former Minister of Bangladesh Railway.

Career
Sengupta was married to veteran Bangladesh Awami League leader Suranjit Sengupta. She was a senior official in the non-governmental organisation Bangladesh Rural Advancement Committee (BRAC). Her husband was a member of Bangladesh Awami League Advisory Council.

Sengupta was elected to parliament from Sunamganj-2 constituency in Sunamganj District. She was elected in a by-election after the death of her husband, Suranjit Sengupta. She defeated her nearest rival Mahbub Hossain Reju in the by election, she had more than double the vote her opponent had. Her husband was the Member of Parliament from Sunamganj-2. The seat was vacated after he died on 5 February 2017. Joya Sengupta was sworn into office on 16 April 2017 by the Speaker of the Parliament, Shirin Sharmin Chaudhury, at the Jatiya Sangsad Bhaban. On 13 November 2017 she was nominated to the five-member panel of chairmen for the 18th session of Bangladesh Jatiya Sangsad (National Parliament). In absence of the speaker and deputy speaker, the panel is responsible for conducting the parliamentary session. Her constituency, Sunamganj, was flooded by flash floods and according to her affected nearly three hundred thousand people.

References

Living people
1943 births
Awami League politicians
10th Jatiya Sangsad members
11th Jatiya Sangsad members
Bangladeshi Hindus